The 2008 Mountain West Conference men's basketball tournament was played at the Thomas & Mack Center in Las Vegas, Nevada from March 12–15, 2008. The tournament was sponsored by Phillips 66 and all first round, quarterfinal, and semifinal games were broadcast live on the MountainWest Sports Network and CBS College Sports Network, while the championship game was broadcast on Versus.

For the second straight year, tournament host UNLV defeated regular season league champion BYU 76–61 to win the Mountain West Conference tournament championship and earn the league's automatic bid to the NCAA Tournament.

Regular season
BYU entered the tournament as the first team in Mountain West history to win back-to-back regular season titles.

* Denotes regular season champion.

Source:

Tournament bracket

Note: Asterisk (*) denotes game ended in overtime.

Source:

Games

First round

Colorado St. vs. Wyoming
Before the game, Wyoming held the lead in all-time matchups against Colorado State, 125–83, and had won every matchup this season. It was the third meeting of the two teams in
MWC Tournament play. The Rams are now 7–7 in Mountain West tournament history, while the Cowboys are 6–9. 9th seed Colorado State entered the contest with 8th seed Wyoming having gone 0–16 in conference play during the regular season, but stunned Wyoming with a 68–63 win during the first round game of the tournament.  Junior Marcus Walker led the Rams with 22 points followed by true Freshman Andre McFarland with 18.  Wyoming received 29 points from Junior Brandon Ewing, 19 of which were in the first half. Colorado St. went on to play top seed BYU.

Quarterfinals

BYU vs. Colorado St.
Colorado St. kept it close through the first half by shooting threes, but BYU took off early in the second half.  BYU shot over 70% in the second half.  BYU's Lee Cummard was the player of the game.

San Diego St. vs. Air Force
Lorrenzo Wade sank four free throws and grabbed a critical rebound in the final seven seconds, allowing San Diego State to edge Air Force 53–49.

UNLV vs. TCU
UNLV answered TCU's record onslaught of 3-pointers with a three-point play by Wink Adams in the closing seconds that gave the Runnin' Rebels an 89–88 win over the Horned Frogs.

Utah vs. New Mexico
Luke Nevill made all the plays down the stretch despite playing with four fouls over the final 11½ minutes and the Utah Utes put a crimp in New Mexico's NCAA plans with an 82–80 overtime victory over the Lobos.  New Mexico's J.R. Giddens missed a potential game tying lay-up as the clock expired in overtime.

Semifinals

BYU vs. San Diego St.
Lee Cummard's 20 points led 24th-ranked BYU past pesky San Diego State 63–54, sending the Cougars to the championship for the second straight year.

UNLV vs. Utah
Wink Adams and Curtis Terry each scored 20 points, leading UNLV back into the Mountain West Conference championship with a 61–55 win over Utah.

Finals

UNLV vs. BYU
In a rematch of the 2007 MWC Championship game, the second-seed UNLV Runnin' Rebels challenged the top-seed and nationally ranked BYU Cougars.  The two teams split the regular season series in blowouts.  UNLV defeated BYU 76–61 to win their second straight conference championship and their third overall.  BYU led at halftime, but the Runnin' Rebels produced a slaughter in the second half.  UNLV's junior guard Wink Adams was named the Tournament MVP after scoring 23 points, 14 of which came in the final 7 minutes of the game and senior Curtis Terry added 20 points for the Rebels.  BYU was led by freshman guard Jimmer Fredette, who had 17 points.

References

External links
Official Site

Mountain West Conference men's basketball tournament
Tournament
Mountain West Conference men's basketball tournament
Mountain West Conference men's basketball tournament